Ab Garm (also Romanized as Āb Garm) is a village in Hanza Rural District, Hanza District, Rabor County, Kerman Province, Iran. At the 2006 census, its population was 37, in 6 families. It is a populated place - a city, town, village, or other agglomeration of buildings where people live and work.

References 

Populated places in Rabor County